Ildikó Kishonti (26 April 1947 – 30 August 2009) was a Hungarian actress. She also appeared on television.

Filmography

References

External links

1947 births
2009 deaths
Hungarian actresses